Puturosu may refer to the following places in Romania:

 Puturosu, a tributary of the Burla in Botoșani County
 Puturosu, a tributary of the Cascue in Argeș County
 Puturosu, a tributary of the Jijia in Iași County
 Puturosu, a tributary of the Toplița in Harghita County
 Puturosu, a mountain in the volcanic Ciomadul massif, in Covasna County